is a Japanese manga artist and musician. He has been drawing manga since he was four years old, and for most of his professional career has created two series simultaneously. The stories to many of these were co-written in collaboration with his former editor, Takashi Nagasaki. Urasawa has been called one of the artists that changed the history of manga and has won numerous awards, including the Shogakukan Manga Award three times, the Tezuka Osamu Cultural Prize twice, and the Kodansha Manga Award once. By December 2021, his various works had over 140 million copies in circulation worldwide.

Urasawa's first major work was illustrating the action series Pineapple Army (1985–1988), which was written by Kazuya Kudo. The first serial that he wrote and illustrated himself, and his first major success, was the sports manga Yawara! (1986–1993). He then illustrated the adventure series Master Keaton (1988–1994), which was written by Hokusei Katsushika and Nagasaki, and created the sports manga Happy! (1993–1999). The thriller Monster (1994–2001) was his first to receive international acclaim and success, which continued with the science fiction mystery 20th Century Boys (1999–2006). Following the acclaimed Pluto (2003–2009), which is a re-imagining of Astro Boy by Osamu Tezuka, one of Urasawa's biggest influences, he and Nagasaki created the mystery series Billy Bat (2008–2016). After two short series, a sequel to Master Keaton with Nagasaki and Mujirushi: The Sign of Dreams, Urasawa began his currently ongoing Asadora! in 2018.

Early life
Urasawa cited Osamu Tezuka as one of his heroes, being particularly fond of his manga Phoenix. "The Greatest Robot on Earth" and "The Artificial Sun" arcs of Tezuka's Astro Boy were his first experiences with manga at four or five years old. Around that same age is when he started to draw manga, and at eight he created his first complete story. Even at a young age, Urasawa saw the gulf between his work and that of a "real manga artist." He said that he could also identify manga that was "commercialized" and made just for the money, something he did not want to do. Thus he never thought of becoming a professional manga artist, and graduated from Meisei University with a degree in economics.

Career

Debut and success: 1982–2009
When Urasawa visited Shogakukan to apply for a business job, he decided to bring some manga he had drawn out of curiosity. An editor from Weekly Shōnen Sunday did not give him the time of day, but the head editor of Big Comic Original happened to walk by and felt the work was better suited for Big Comic Spirits, and took Urasawa to their editorial department. He ended up submitting manga for their 1982 New Manga Artist Award, which his unpublished work "Return" won. It was only then that he thought about becoming a professional manga artist. It was a year after winning the award that Urasawa met Takashi Nagasaki, who would become his longtime editor and collaborator.

After working as an assistant, Urasawa made his professional debut in 1983 with "Beta!", which was published in a special issue of Golgo 13. He then created the short serialized work Dancing Policeman the following year. Urasawa began his first major serialized work, Pineapple Army, in 1985 in the semimonthly Big Comic Original. He was the illustrator of the series, while Kazuya Kudo was its writer. It ended in 1988 and was collected into eight tankōbon volumes. While working on Pineapple Army, Urasawa began Yawara! in the weekly Big Comic Spirits in 1986 which he wrote and illustrated himself. It earned him the 1989 Shogakukan Manga Award in the General category. That same year it was adapted into a live-action film and an anime television series. It ended in 1993 and was collected into 29 volumes.

When Pineapple Army ended, Urasawa began Master Keaton for Big Comic Original in November 1988. He illustrated it, while Hokusei Katsushika wrote it. It ended in August 1994 and was collected into 18 volumes. An anime television adaptation began in 1998, before finishing as an original video animation in 2000. Likewise when Yawara! ended, Urasawa began another solo series in Big Comic Spirits. Happy! ran from 1993 until 1999 and was collected into 23 volumes. It was adapted into two live-action television films in 2006.

Following Master Keatons end, Urasawa began Monster in Big Comic Original in December 1994. It earned him the 1999 Tezuka Osamu Cultural Prize, and his second Shogakukan Manga Award in the General category in 2001. It ended in December 2001, was collected into 18 volumes, and adapted into an anime television series in 2004. Junot Díaz, Pulitzer Prize for Fiction winner, praised Monster and proclaimed "Urasawa is a national treasure in Japan." With Happy!s ending, Urasawa began 20th Century Boys in Big Comic Spirits in 1999. It earned him the 2001 Kodansha Manga Award in the General category, and his third Shogakukan Manga Award in the General category in 2002. It ended in 2006 and was collected into 22 volumes. The story briefly continued as 21st Century Boys in 2007, which was collected into two volumes. 20th Century Boys was adapted into three live-action films, which were released in 2008 and 2009.

While working on 20th Century Boys, Urasawa began adapting "The Greatest Robot on Earth" story arc of Osamu Tezuka's Astro Boy into the series Pluto. It was serialized in Big Comic Original from September 9, 2003, to April 5, 2009, and collected into 8 volumes. It earned him his second Tezuka Osamu Cultural Prize. In 2008, Urasawa began working for Kodansha, serializing Billy Bat in Morning. It ran from October 16, 2008, to August 18, 2016, and was collected into 20 volumes. Also in 2008, Urasawa and Nagasaki took guest teaching posts at Nagoya Zokei University, where they taught "Modern Expression Course: Manga Classes" two to three times a year, although the class met every month. Initially planned for only five students, he agreed to expand it to fifteen in an effort to create more "real artists."

2010–2019
Oricon held a poll on the Mangaka that Changed the History of Manga in 2010, mangaka being the Japanese word for a manga artist, and Urasawa came in tenth. In 2011, Urasawa illustrated a picture book adaptation of Kosuke Hamada's story Red Oni Cries.

Urasawa began writing a sequel to Master Keaton in 2012 titled Master Keaton Remaster. When asked why he went back to a series after so many years, Urasawa stated it was because with the original series he had a hard time making the story he wanted due to contractual obligation, and because people affected by the 2011 Tōhoku earthquake and tsunami said they had enjoyed the series, so he wanted to do something for them. Beginning in the March 2012 issue of Big Comic Original it finished in 2014 and was collected into a single volume. As a guest at the 2012 Japan Expo in France, Urasawa talked about how he entered the manga industry, gave a live drawing demonstration, and performed two songs as a musician, and joined rock band Hemenway on stage the following day.

Between 2013 and 2014, Urasawa contributed to the essay series "The Old Guys" that was published in Shueisha's Jump X magazine. His contributions and those of the other 32 writers who participated were collected into a July 2015 volume of the same name. In August 2013, Urasawa created his first "monster manga" titled "Kaiju Kingdom", a 41-page one-shot published in Big Comic. Urasawa is the host of the NHK Educational TV documentary series Urasawa Naoki no Manben, which focuses on a different manga artist each episode and explores their individual styles. It began as a one-off special in November 2014, a first season was launched in September 2015, a second in March 2016, a third in September 2016, and a fourth in March 2017. After three years, the show returned in October 2020 with Neo added to the end of its title. The show won the December 2015 Planning Award as part of Quick Japan's annual TV of the Year awards, decided by broadcast writers. The June 9, 2021, episode on Yoshikazu Yasuhiko won the Grand Prize in the entertainment category at the 2022 Japan Media Arts Festival. Beginning in July 2015, Urasawa started contributing to the "Musica Nostra" column series that was published in Shueisha's Grand Jump magazine.

An art exhibition of Urasawa's work was on display in Tokyo from January 16 to March 31, 2016, before moving to Osaka from November 26 to January 25, 2017. It included illustrations, manga manuscripts, story notes, and childhood manga. Urasawa contributed a short, full color, left-to-right manga titled "Tanshin Funin/Solo Mission" to the February 2016 French comics anthology The Tipping Point to commemorate publisher Humanoids' 40th anniversary. Re-titled Turning Point, the anthology was published in Japan in September 2017. He created a short three-page manga about 1960s British rock band the Beatles time-traveling to 2016. Released in June 2016 on the website of Tokyo radio station InterFM897, it coincides with the TV program KKBOX Here comes The Beatles and celebrates the 50th anniversary of the band's visit to Japan.

On April 9, 2017, Urasawa began co-hosting a radio program with actor and comedian Junji Takada. Junji and Naoki airs Sundays at 5pm on Nippon Cultural Broadcasting and features both men talking about their lives, professions, and favorite hobbies. That year Urasawa also began the limited series Mujirushi: The Sign of Dreams in a collaboration with France's Louvre Museum. It began in Big Comic Original in October 2017 and ended on February 20, 2018.

In January 2018, Urasawa attended the 45th Angoulême International Comics Festival in France, where he received the Fauve Special Award and the Fauve Polar SNCF Special Award for mystery. The festival also held an art exhibit of his work, before it moved to Paris from February 13 to March 31. Urasawa was the subject of the June 23 Wowow Prime TV program Nonfiction W Urasawa Naoki ~Tensai Mangaka no Owaranai Tabi~, which followed him around Europe, including to the 2018 Angoulême International Comics Festival and meeting Klaus Voormann in Germany. Urasawa began Asadora! in Big Comic Spirits on October 6, 2018. The November 2018 issue of Monthly Big Comic Spirits, released on September 27, was given the special title "Urasawa Jack". It included Urasawa's one-shot "It's a Beautiful Day", which adapted a story told to him by musician Kenji Endo, an interview between him and Shigeru Izumiya, and a calendar featuring illustrations of "beautiful women" by the artist. On December 27, Urasawa co-hosted a special radio program about Osamu Tezuka alongside Chiaki Kuriyama for Nippon Cultural Broadcasting.

In 2019, he designed the official posters of the 2019 Osaka Women's Marathon and a classic car charity event organized by Toshiaki Karasawa for reconstruction after the 2011 Tōhoku earthquake and tsunami. On January 23, 2019, Japan House Los Angeles presented the first North American exhibit of Urasawa's work, titled "This is MANGA – the Art of NAOKI URASAWA". The exhibit ran until March 28, 2019, and featured more than 400 original drawings and storyboards. Urasawa participated in an artist discussion and book signing on opening day. The exhibit moved to Japan House London from June 5 to July 28, also attended by the artist. Urasawa was a 2019 nominee for entry into the Will Eisner Hall of Fame.

2020–present
In 2020, Urasawa drew advertisements for the Samsonite Red luggage brand, and was chosen to create one of the official posters for the 2020 Summer Olympics. For the second year in a row, he drew the poster for the Osaka Women's Marathon. In June, Urasawa created the cover portrait for Universal Japan's 250th anniversary release of music by Ludwig van Beethoven. He also appears in July 2020's ZK/Zunō Keisatsu 50 Mirai e no Kodō, a documentary film about the rock band Zunō Keisatsu. Urasawa directed and illustrated the music video, and illustrated the cover art, for Kazuyoshi Saito's March 2021 digital single "Boy". In November 2021, Urasawa's first one-shot for Shueisha, "Dr. Toguro Dokuro no Saigo", was published in Grand Jump to celebrate the magazine's 10th anniversary. By December 2021, his various works had over 140 million copies in circulation worldwide. He had an acting role in the December 2022 film Tenjō no Hana, portraying poet Haruo Satō.

Style

Fusanosuke Natsume said that prior to entering university, Urasawa's style showed influence from Shinji Nagashima and Osamu Tezuka's 1970s work, but went on to claim that in 1979 it became aligned with that of Katsuhiro Otomo. When talking in 1997 about the future of manga, Urasawa opined that "Tezuka created the form that exists today, then caricatures appeared next, and comics changed again when Katsuhiro Otomo came on the scene. I don't think there's any room left for further changes." He has also expressed admiration for French bande dessinée artist Moebius and American novelist Stephen King. Although Urasawa's works like Yawara! had light entertainment with cute young girls, Natsume says Urasawa developed his own personal style with Monster, which he described as realistic, or directorially based, with cinematic panel layouts similar to Otomo and gekiga artists. Natsume also noted that many of his characters resemble famous movie stars. Urasawa himself described his approach to manga as similar to storyboarding a movie, and acknowledged his work as adult-oriented, stating that even as a child he never liked manga aimed at children. However, he noted that he and Otomo both prefer to have their work called manga and not gekiga.

When asked where he gets ideas from, Urasawa said "I have been illustrating all my life. Inspiration is everywhere, when I get in the bath, when I get out. It's whether you are perceiving these ideas and whether you are able to catch them." He also said that he does not worry about what the readers want, and simply draws stories that he finds interesting. The artist said that while manga is often looked at as simple, he makes sure to use subtleties to show dramatic expressions and convey emotion, claiming "You won't find two expressions that are the same" in his work.

On his storytelling process, Urasawa states, "When I start a new project, I start with the larger arc of the story. I visualize a movie trailer for that story, and after I compose this movie trailer in my mind, there comes a point where I'm so excited about it that I have to write the story. And then I imagine, 'Where do I start to begin to tell this narrative?' and that's usually the first chapter." He does not plan the story out in advance, claiming that it tells him where it wants to go, and that if the story does not keep surprising even him, then he can not continue making it.

He also does not determine the page or panel layouts in advance. Having drawn manga for over five decades, he just follows his instincts, explaining "When I start to structure a story narratively, the question of tempo — developing a character moment-to-moment and then jumping to a two-page spread — how do you determine where that happens? It's like breathing to me — I know when it feels right."

For most of his career, Urasawa has written two different series simultaneously. With one of them being a weekly serialization and the other having a semimonthly schedule, Urasawa had six deadlines a month and said the only time off he had was when sleeping or eating. Urasawa frequently collaborates with manga editor and author Takashi Nagasaki, to the point where Nagasaki has been called his "producer." The two met when Nagasaki was made Urasawa's editor upon his debut. Although the two continue to collaborate even after Nagasaki became freelance, they rarely socialize outside of work. Urasawa said that following the anime adaptation of Yawara!, he has requested that he be able to check the scripts for any adaptation of his works. Until 2018's ongoing Asadora!, none of Urasawa's manga had ever been legally available in digital formats. The author stated that he prefers physical books. However, his earlier works began receiving digital releases in 2022, limited to Japan.

Music

Urasawa is also a musician. He stated "A lot of artists really struggled to decide whether to become manga artists or rock musicians, so the two are intertwined, they're synonymous!" Urasawa started playing guitar in junior high school inspired by folk rock singer-songwriters Takuro Yoshida and Bob Dylan.

Urasawa wrote and performed the song , which was released on a CD included in the 2002 first pressing of volume 11 of 20th Century Boys. He released the limited single  on June 4, 2008, and his debut album  on November 29, 2008. Both were produced by Koji Wakui, while the album features Hiroyuki Namba and other musicians. A single featuring a remix of T. Rex's "20th Century Boy" and Urasawa's "Bob Lennon (Kenji no Uta)" was released on August 19, 2009. Urasawa and Mitsuru Kuramoto wrote and performed  under the name  to be the theme of the 2011 NTT Docomo TV show Tsubuyaki Sanshirō ~Ippon Nau!~. In 2012 he performed a Japanese cover of Bob Dylan's "Girl from the North Country" and "Guta lala suda lala" from his series 20th Century Boys at the Japan Expo, and the following day he joined rock band Hemenway on stage.

Urasawa's second album,  which he wrote and produced himself, was released in 2016. Urasawa wrote a demo for a song titled  and sent it to musician Mike Viola, who finished the track and invited Urasawa to Los Angeles to play on it. The people playing on the song are Urasawa, Viola, drummer Jim Keltner, and Mitsuru Kuramoto. It is included on the album The Best of Mike Viola which was released on January 22, 2020, with the performance credited to Monaka. In 2020, Urasawa was one of many people who submitted lyrics that were adopted by Sunplaza Nakano-kun into a new version of Bakufu Slump's 1984 song .

Works

Serials
  - written by Kazuya Kudo
 
  - written with Hokusei Katsushika and Takashi Nagasaki
 
 
  /  (1999–2006, 2007)
  - written with Takashi Nagasaki, based on a work by Osamu Tezuka
  - written with Takashi Nagasaki
  - written with Takashi Nagasaki

Other manga
 "Swimmers" (1979) - Unpublished until the May 13, 2003, issue of Evening.
 "Return" (1981)
 "Beta!!" (1983) - published in a special issue of Golgo 13
 
 N・A・S・A (1988)
 Jigoro! (1994) - includes the titular series,  and "A Bat & 2 Balls"
 
  - written with Takashi Nagasaki
 
 
  - original draft by musician Kenji Endo

Television, film, and radio
 20th Century Boys: Beginning of the End (2008) - co-writer of the film's screenplay
 20th Century Boys 2: The Last Hope (2009) - supervisor of the film's screenplay
 20th Century Boys 3: Redemption (2009) - co-writer of the film's screenplay
 The Tibetan Dog (2011) - initial character designs
  - host of the TV show
  - co-host of the radio show
  - as himself
  - co-host of the radio special
  - as himself
 Urasawa Naoki no Manben Neo (2020–2022) - host of the TV show
 "Boy" (2021) - directed and illustrated the Kazuyoshi Saito music video
  - as Haruo Satō

Other work
 Another Monster (2002) - novel written with Takashi Nagasaki
 Pleasure! (2003) - album cover for Domino88
  - album cover for Koji Wakui
  - book written with Koji Wakui, includes the manga 
  - art book
  - album cover for Shigeru Izumiya
  - DVD cover for Waraimeshi
  - DVD cover for Waraimeshi
  - picture book of a Kosuke Hamada story, produced by Takashi Nagasaki
  - one of the song selectors for Kyoko Koizumi
  - kanzenban edition book cover for Kiyoshiro Imawano
 "Be Hero" (2014) - single cover for Fudanjuku
  - guidebook
  - book cover for Akiko Yano
 "Boy" (2021) - single cover for Kazuyoshi Saito

Awards and nominations

References

Further reading
 James Dorsey.  "Urasawa Naoki's Twentieth Century Boys: Autobiographical Manga for Japan's Children of the 60s,” in Michael A. Chaney, ed., Graphic Subjects: Critical Essays on Autobiography and Graphic Novels (Madison, WI: University of Wisconsin Press, 2011), pp. 117~120.

External links

 
  URASAWA CHANNEL on YouTube
 Urasawa Naoki no Manben official website
 Urasawa Naoki no Manben Neo official website
 
 Naoki Urasawa at The Encyclopedia of Science Fiction

 
Manga artists from Tokyo
Osamu Tezuka
Winner of Kodansha Manga Award (General)
Eisner Award winners
People from Fuchū, Tokyo
1960 births
Living people
Japanese guitarists
Japanese male singer-songwriters
Japanese folk singers
Japanese television presenters
Japanese radio personalities
21st-century Japanese singers